Jessie Hill (December 9, 1932 – September 17, 1996) was an American R&B and Louisiana blues  singer and songwriter, best remembered for the classic song "Ooh Poo Pah Doo".

Life and career 
Hill was born in New Orleans, Louisiana, United States. By his teens he was playing drums in local bands, and in 1951 he formed his own group, the House Rockers. After periods performing as drummer with Professor Longhair and then Huey "Piano" Smith, Hill formed a new version of the House Rockers in 1958, which enabled him to focus on singing with the band. He is the grandfather of James and Troy Andrews.

The origins of "Ooh Poo Pah Doo" were apparently created from a tune played by a local pianist, who was known only as Big Four. Hill wrote the lyrics and melody, later expanding the work with an intro taken from Dave Bartholomew. It was further honed on stage, before Hill recorded a demo that he shopped to local record labels, finally recording a session at Cosimo Matassa's studio produced by Allen Toussaint.

Upon its 1960 release on Minit Records, "Ooh Poo Pah Doo" emerged as a favorite at Mardi Gras, selling 800,000 copies and reaching #3 on the Billboard R&B chart and #28 in the Billboard Hot 100 pop chart. There have been over 100 cover versions of "Ooh Poo Pah Doo" recorded and performed live over the years by other popular musicians, most notably The Shirelles and Ike and Tina Turner.

His follow-up "Whip It On Me" reached #91 on the Billboard Hot 100 in 1960. Further recordings in New Orleans were less successful, and he moved to California to work with fellow New Orleans musicians including Harold Battiste and Mac Rebennack. In this period, he wrote songs recorded by Ike and Tina Turner, Sonny and Cher, and Willie Nelson.

A 1972 solo album was unsuccessful, and he began to suffer financial difficulties exacerbated by a drinking problem. These problems continued after his return to New Orleans in 1977, and several benefit gigs did little to revive his personal or professional fortunes.

Death and legacy 
Hill died of heart and renal failure in New Orleans in September 1996, at the age of 63. He is buried in Holt Cemetery in New Orleans, in a pauper's grave for the poorest citizens of the city.

Two of his grandsons are James Andrews (musician) and Troy "Trombone Shorty" Andrews. The pair performed "Ooh Poo Pah Doo" in Episode 7 of the HBO series Treme. A third grandson, Travis "Trumpet Black" Hill, was a rising New Orleans-based performer who died from an infection while on tour in Tokyo on May 4, 2015.

See also
Trombone Shorty
Tremé neighborhood in New Orleans, Louisiana

References

External links

Trumpet Black: The Jazz Funeral of a New Orleans Rising Star,  Anthony Taille. Retrieved 1-20-16.

1932 births
1996 deaths
Rhythm and blues musicians from New Orleans
American rhythm and blues singers
Songwriters from Louisiana
American blues singers
Louisiana blues musicians
Chess Records artists
Deaths from kidney failure
Singers from Louisiana
Minit Records artists
Downey Records artists
Wand Records artists
Blue Thumb Records artists
African-American male songwriters
20th-century African-American male singers